Astore District is one of the 14 districts of the Pakistani-administered territory of Gilgit−Baltistan. Its administrative headquarters are located at Eidgah in the Astore Valley. The Astore District is bounded by Gilgit District to the north, Roundu District to the northeast, Skardu District to the east, Kharmang District to the southeast, Diamer District to the west, the Neelum District of Azad Jammu and Kashmir to the southwest, and the Bandipore District of Indian-administered Jammu and Kashmir to the south.

Astore Valley

The nearest glacier after entering the valley is the Harcho Glacier, and the most accessible glacier is the Siachen Glacier.

Accessibility 
Eidgah is connected to Gilgit, which is well connected by air with Islamabad and by road with Peshawar, Swat, Islamabad-Rawalpindi, Chitral, and Skardu. There are two ways of access to Eidgah. The first is from Skardu via the Deosai Plateau , but that route cannot be used from November to June due to heavy snowfall.  The second way, year round, is from Gilgit via Jaglot .

History
Around 1600, according to the Imperial Gazetteer of India:

References

 
Districts of Gilgit-Baltistan